Banlung is the capital of Ratanakiri Province in northeastern Cambodia, and is  636 kilometres from the Cambodian capital of Phnom Penh. Ratanakiri Province borders Vietnam and Laos.  Banlung had been previously known as Banlung district before it officially gained town status. The town has a population of around 17,000 and the surrounding district has a population of 23,888.

The town became the capital of Ratanakiri Province in 1979, following the fall of the Khmer Rouge. The capital was moved from Veun Sai to Banlung in order to facilitate trade with Vietnam  (prior to Veun Sai, the capital was Lumphat). Prior to 1979, Banlung was known as Labansiek.

It is a relatively lively commercial centre; people from surrounding villages often come to the town market to sell their goods.

Three kilometres west of Banlung are the Katieng Waterfalls, where Ratnakiri's last elephants are covered by a conservation programme operated by the Airavata Elephant Foundation.

Transportation 
The most convenient way to reach Banlung is by road. It is well connected with its neighbouring cities such as Stung Treng, Kratie and Phnom Penh. One can fly into Phnom Penh International Airport and travel by road from there.

Administration

Banlung city is divided into 4 sangkats (communes) which together contain 20 villages.

Infrastructure
Electricity in Banlung is produced by the nearby O Chum 2 Hydropower Dam, but in the region only around 13% of homes have access to electricity.

Gallery

References

External links
 
 Big Stories, Small Towns, an online documentary about the town of Banlung

 

Provincial capitals in Cambodia
Cities in Cambodia
Populated places in Ratanakiri province